NGC 3593 is a lenticular galaxy located in the constellation Leo. It has a morphological classification of SA(s)0/a, which indicates it is a lenticular galaxy of the pure spiral type. Despite this, it has a large amount of hydrogen, both in its molecular and atomic (H) form. It is a starburst galaxy, which means it is forming new stars at a high rate. This is occurring in a band of gas surrounding the central nucleus. There is a single arm, which spirals outward from this ring. It is frequently but not consistently identified as a member of the Leo Triplet group.

This galaxy is known to contain two counter-rotating populations of stars—that is, one set of stars is rotating in the opposite direction with respect to the other. One means for this to occur is by acquiring gas from an external source, which then undergoes star formation. An alternative is by a merger with a second galaxy. Neither scenario has been ruled out.

A dynamical study found that there is likely a supermassive black hole (SMBH) at the center of NGC 3593.

References

External links

 HubbleSite NewsCenter: Pictures and description on NGC 3593

Unbarred spiral galaxies
Leo (constellation)
3593
34257
06272
Virgo Supercluster